Aphonopelma helluo is a species of spider in the family Theraphosidae, found in Mexico.

References

helluo
Spiders described in 1891
Spiders of Mexico